The 2012 United States women's national soccer team season was dominated by the 2012 Women's Olympic Football Tournament. The start of the year saw the team compete in the CONCACAF Olympic qualifying tournament and then in July they participated in the main event itself. The team won both tournaments. In between they also played in Algarve Cup, the Kirin Challenge Cup and the 2012 Sweden Invitational. They also won the latter tournament.

2012 CONCACAF Women's Olympic qualifying tournament

Group stage

Semi-finals

Final

International friendly

2012 Algarve Cup

Group stage

Third-place match

2012 Women's Kirin Challenge Cup

2012 Sweden Invitational

2012 Women's Olympic Football Tournament

Squad

Group G

Quarter-finals

Semi-finals

Gold-medal match

References

 
2012
National soccer team